The 2023 Finnish Cup is the 68th season of the Finnish Cup football competition.

Cup will be played as a one legged knockout tournament. A total of 333 teams participate the competition. Lower league teams get home advantage until the fourth round. Teams are divided into geographical groups for the draw until 5th round.

Calendar

Round 0 
66 teams participate in this round

Group 1

Group 2

Group 3

Group 4

Group 5

Group 6

Group 7

Round 1

Group 1

Group 2

Group 3

Group 4

Group 5

Group 6

Group 7

Group 8

Group 9

Group 10

References

External links
Official page 
Finland - List of Cup Finals, RSSSF.com

2022
Finnish Cup
Cup 2023-24